The 2018 BRICS summit is the tenth annual BRICS summit, an international relations conference attended by the heads of state or heads of government of the five member states Brazil, Russia, India, China and South Africa. The summit was held in Johannesburg, South Africa, the second time the South Africa has hosted the summit after the 2013 summit.

Partnership on New Industrial Revolution (PartNIR):
It is a programme of partnership among BRICS nation that will focus on Maximising the opportunities arising from the fourth industrial revolution/New Industrial Revolution. It was formed at the 10th BRICS summit in Johannesburg. The 11th summit will be held in Brazil for that remaining partners extended full support. The 4th to 7th summit at Ufa Russia are related to NDB.

Participating leaders

References

2018 conferences
2018 in international relations
21st-century diplomatic conferences (BRICS)
10
Diplomatic conferences in South Africa
Johannesburg